Maireth Alejandra Pérez Ramírez (born 31 March 2001) is a Colombian footballer who plays as a midfielder for Ecuadorian Super Liga Femenina club Ñañas and the Colombia women's national team.

International career
Pérez made her senior debut for Colombia on 9 November 2019.

References

2001 births
Living people
Women's association football midfielders
Women's association football forwards
Colombian women's footballers
People from Valledupar
Colombia women's international footballers
Independiente Medellín footballers
21st-century Colombian women